The 2011–12 KNVB Cup was the 94th season of the Dutch national football knockout tournament. The competition began on 24 August 2011 with the matches of Round 1 and ended with the final on 8 April 2012. FC Twente were the defending champions having won the cup the previous season.
The winner PSV Eindhoven qualifies for the play-off round of the 2012–13 UEFA Europa League.

Calendar
The calendar for the 2011–12 KNVB Cup was as follows.

First round
56 amateur clubs competed in this stage of the competition for a place in the Second Round. These matches took place on 24 August 2011.

|}

Second round
The 28 winners from the First Round entered this stage of the competition along with the 18 Eerste Divisie clubs and the 18 Eredivisie clubs. These matches took place from 20 to 22 September 2011.

|}

Third round
These matches took place from 25 to 27 October 2011.

|}

Fourth round
These matches took place from 20 to 22 December 2011.

|}

1 The original match was abandoned in the 38th minute with Ajax leading 1–0 after AZ left the pitch when their goalkeeper Esteban Alvarado received a red card for kicking a drunk fan that invaded the field and attacked him; the red card was later rescinded. The match was replayed in full behind closed doors on 19 January 2012.

Quarter-finals
These matches took place on 31 January 2012.

|}

Semi-finals

Final

References

External links
  

2011-12
2011–12 domestic association football cups
KNVB